Silsby may refer to:
Paula D. Silsby, a former U.S. Attorney
Silsby Spalding (1886-1949), American businessman and politician; the first Mayor of Beverly Hills, California from 1926 to 1928.
Richvale, California, formerly called Silsby